Zsolt Nemcsik (born 15 August 1977 in Budapest) is a Hungarian sabre fencer. He competed at three Olympic Games.

Nemcsik's two greatest accomplishments is winning the silver medal in the 2004 Olympic Games after losing to Aldo Montano in the final, and also winning the gold medal in the 2007 World Fencing Championships after beating France in the final.

In 2010 he moved to Frascati, joining the local fencing club. While continuing his career as an athlete, he's now also involved in teaching.

Other achievements
 1998 World Fencing Championships, team sabre
 2001 World Fencing Championships, team sabre
 2003 World Fencing Championships, team sabre
 2004 Athens Summer Olympics, individual sabre
 2006 World Fencing Championships, individual sabre
 2007 World Fencing Championships, team sabre

Awards
 Hungarian Fencer of the Year (1): 2001, 2004, 2005, 2006

Orders and special awards
  Order of Merit of the Republic of Hungary – Knight's Cross (2004)

References

1977 births
Living people
Hungarian male sabre fencers
Fencers at the 2000 Summer Olympics
Fencers at the 2004 Summer Olympics
Fencers at the 2008 Summer Olympics
Olympic fencers of Hungary
Olympic silver medalists for Hungary
Olympic medalists in fencing
Fencers from Budapest
Medalists at the 2004 Summer Olympics
21st-century Hungarian people